Rockbound Neighbors is an album by Nana Mizuki. It was released on December 12, 2012 in three editions: a CD only edition and two limited CD+BD/DVD editions. Two limited editions includes two videos: photo shooting of the album and the special live - Heian Jingu Hounou Kouen ~Sougetsu no Utage~.

Track listing
Avalon no Oukan（アヴァロンの王冠）
Lyrics: Hibiki
Composition: Junpei Fujita (Elements Garden)
Arrangements: Evan Call (Elements Garden)
Naked Soldier
Lyrics & Composition: KOUTAPAI
Arrangements: Masato Nakayama (Elements Garden)
Get my drift?
Lyrics: Hassy
 Composition: Hajime Kato
Arrangements: Shogo Ohnishi
Lovely Fruit
Lyrics: Hibiki
Composition and Arrangements: Noriyasu Agematsu (Elements Garden)
Ending song for the anime "Toriko"
Darling Plastic（ダーリンプラスティック）
Lyrics: Hiroyuki Ito
Composition and Arrangements: Shoko Fujibayashi
Ending theme for the Tokyo FM show "Nana Mizuki's M World"
 Bright Stream
Lyrics: Nana Mizuki
Composition: Eriko Yoshiki
Arrangements: Hitoshi Fujima (Elements Garden)
Theme song for the movie "Magical Girl Lyrical Nanoha THE MOVIE 2nd A's"
Hoshikuzu Symphony（星屑シンフォニー）
Lyrics & Composition: Shihori
Arrangements: Shinya Saito
Linkage
Lyrics: Yuumao
Composition: Shunryuu
Arrangements: Katou Yuusuke
Theme song for the 3DS/PSP game "Unchained Blades Exiv"
Star Road
Lyrics & Composition: Nana Mizuki
Arrangements: Hitoshi Fujima (Elements Garden)
Synchrogazer -Aufwachen Form-
Lyrics: Nana Mizuki
Composition and Arrangements: Noriyasu Agematsu (Elements Garden)
Opening song for the anime "Senki Zessho Symphogear"
Crescent Child
Lyrics: Shoko Fujibayashi
Composition: Takashi Matsuiki
Arrangements: Integral Clover
Kiseki no Melodia（奇跡のメロディア）
Lyrics: Nana Mizuki
Composition: Noriyasu Agematsu (Elements Garden)
Arrangements: Hitoshi Fujima (Elements Garden)
Theme song for the PSP game "Shining Arc only"
Metro Baroque
Lyrics: Nana Mizuki
Composition: Yashikin
Arrangements: Masato Nakayama (Elements Garden)
Theme song for the movie "Blood-C: The Last Dark"
 Happy☆Go-Round!
Lyrics: Rico
Composition and Arrangements: Shinya Saito
Theme song for the original drama series "Switch Girl! 2"
Sacred Force -Extended Mix-
Lyrics: Hibiki
Composition: Shihori
Arrangements: Hitoshi Fujima (Elements Garden)
Insert song for the movie "Magical Girl Lyrical Nanoha THE MOVIE 2nd A's"
Yakusoku（約束）
Lyrics: Sayuri and Nana Mizuki
Composition: Eriko Yoshiki
Arrangements: Jun Suyuma

Charts

Oricon Sales Chart (Japan)

References

2012 albums
Nana Mizuki albums